Dot.Com is an album released by avant rock musicians, The Residents, in 2000. It was released in a limited edition of 1200 copies.

In 2000, Ralph America collected all of the MP3s they had released on the Buy Or Die website on a CD entitled dot.com. Each MP3 is a never-before-released track from The Residents' history, dating from 1969 to 2000.
Walter Westinghouse, track 9, was a bonus: it had never come out in MP3 format, but only appeared on this CD.

Track listing

 The Sour Song 
 1999 (Prince Cover) 
 Ninth Rain 
 Wanda
 Conceiving Ada Titles
 Paint It Black 
 Hunters Opening Titles 
 Eskimo Opera Proposal Excerpt 
 Walter Westinghouse (Live at the Fillmore '98) 
 I Murdered Mommy 
 I Hear Ya Got Religion 
 Santa Dog For Gamelan Orchestra
 Fire 99 - Santa Dog 2nd Millennium

The Residents albums
2000 compilation albums